The Battle of Nan'ao island (Nan'ao Dao, 南澳岛) was a battle fought between the nationalists (Kuomintang) and the communists. Nan'ao Island (Nan'ao Dao, 南澳岛) of Swatow (now known as Shantou) remained in the nationalist hands after Guangdong fell into communist hands.  On February 23, 1950, the 121st division of the 41st Army of the People's Liberation Army attacked the island.  Faced with such overwhelming enemy, the defenders stood no chance and after eight hours of fighting, the communists succeeded in wiping out the entire nationalist garrison and thus taking the island.  27 nationalist troops were killed, and 1348 were captured, including the  nationalist local commander, the deputy commander-in-chief of the 1st Cantonese Column Wu Chaojun (吴超骏), and the deputy commander of the nationalist 58th division Guo Mengxiong (郭梦熊).  A total of 1304 firearms were also captured.

The nationalist defeat proved that it was impractical to hold on to the outlying islands that were at the doorstep of the enemy but far away from any friendly bases, just like the Wanshan Archipelago Campaign would have done later.  As the battle had shown, once the defenders learned that it was impossible to have any reinforcement, the morale completely collapsed and most of the defenders abandoned their weapons and attempted to hide after merely suffering 27 fatalities, and the enemy spent most of the 8 hours fighting in mop-up operations to round up the demoralized defenders.  Although holding on to a distant island may have propaganda value, any initial political and psychological gains would be negated by the fallout after the inevitable defeat and the loss.

See also
List of Battles of Chinese Civil War
National Revolutionary Army
History of the People's Liberation Army
Chinese Civil War
Battle of Nanpēng Archipelago (on smaller islands in the same county)

References
Zhu, Zongzhen and Wang, Chaoguang, Liberation War History, 1st Edition, Social Scientific Literary Publishing House in Beijing, 2000,  (set)
Zhang, Ping, History of the Liberation War, 1st Edition, Chinese Youth Publishing House in Beijing, 1987,  (pbk.)
Jie, Lifu, Records of the Liberation War: The Decisive Battle of Two Kinds of Fates, 1st Edition, Hebei People's Publishing House in Shijiazhuang, 1990,  (set)
Literary and Historical Research Committee of the Anhui Committee of the Chinese People's Political Consultative Conference, Liberation War, 1st Edition, Anhui People's Publishing House in Hefei, 1987, 
Li, Zuomin, Heroic Division and Iron Horse: Records of the Liberation War, 1st Edition, Chinese Communist Party History Publishing House in Beijing, 2004, 
Wang, Xingsheng, and Zhang, Jingshan, Chinese Liberation War, 1st Edition, People's Liberation Army Literature and Art Publishing House in Beijing, 2001,  (set)
Huang, Youlan, History of the Chinese People's Liberation War, 1st Edition, Archives Publishing House in Beijing, 1992, 
Liu Wusheng, From Yan'an to Beijing: A Collection of Military Records and Research Publications of Important Campaigns in the Liberation War, 1st Edition, Central Literary Publishing House in Beijing, 1993, 

Conflicts in 1950
Nan'ao
1950 in China
Military history of Guangdong
Shantou